"Started with a Song" is a song recorded by Canadian country music artist Brett Kissel. It was released in June 2013 as the first single from his major label debut album, Started with a Song. It became the most added song at Canadian country radio in its first week, surpassing a record set by Taylor Swift's "We Are Never Ever Getting Back Together".

Music video
The music video was directed by Margaret Malandruccolo and premiered in June 2013.

Chart performance
"Started with a Song" debuted at number 87 on the Canadian Hot 100 for the week of July 27, 2013.

Certifications

References

2013 songs
2013 debut singles
Brett Kissel songs
Warner Music Group singles
Songs written by Brett Kissel
Songs written by Craig Wiseman
Music videos directed by Margaret Malandruccolo